The Castles of Burgundy is a board game for two to four players, set in Medieval Burgundy. It was designed by Stefan Feld and illustrated by Julien Delval and Harald Lieske, and was published in 2011 by Ravensburger/alea. It is considered a classic of the Eurogame genre, and is cited as one of the most influential board games of the last decade. It uses dice rolling and dice placement, a modular setup, and set collection as its mechanics. The dice and the ability to change them give players a wide range of options.

Gameplay 
In Castles of Burgundy, players collect hexagonal tiles to fill their personal player boards by drafting them via dice they've collected, and then gain benefits for each tile placed. Players will earn bonuses for filling in a specific region of your board, which is worth more points if done earlier in the game, or for filling all hexes of a specific color on their entire board.

Versions 
In 2014 Yucata, the online game portal, released an online play-by-web version.
In 2016 Ravensburger released Castles of Burgundy: The Card Game. Ravensburger also released a "roll-and-write" version, The Castles of Burgundy: The Dice Game, in 2017. In 2019 DIGIDICED developed versions for Steam, Android, and iOS.

Reception 
A review at Ars Technica described the game as having a "bland theme, dry artwork, chintzy components" but also "some of the best gameplay" in a board game and amongst the "best dice-rolling mechanics in any strategy game".

References

Board games introduced in 2011
Board games with a modular board
Worker placement board games
Middle Ages in popular culture